Widerøe is a Norwegian regional airline. Between 2000 and 2018, the airline operated a fleet consisting entirely of de Havilland Canada/Bombardier Dash 8 aircraft. Since 2018, Widerøe also operates with Embraer E190 E2 aircraft. As of 2017, Widerøe operated 25 of the 39-seat -100/200 series, seven of the 50-seat -300 series and 11 of the 78-seat Q400 series. It holds orders for another four Q400. As of 2018, Widerøe is the world's largest operator of the -100-series.

Fleet

References

Notes

Bibliography

 

Aircraft
Wideroe